The Church of St Mary the Virgin, commonly known as the University Church is a Catholic Church in the Papnövelde Street, Belváros-Lipótváros District (Inner City District) in Budapest, Hungary. From 1786 the church belongs to the former Theological Faculty of the Eötvös Loránd University, and to the Pázmány Péter Catholic University independent of it; before it was the central church of the Pauline Order. The Central Priestly Educational Institute operates in a block adjacent to the church, so that the liturgical services of the church are performed by the priestly students and the chiefs of the institute. The church has two towers and its towers are 56 meters high.

History 

The Pauline Order is the only Hungarian-founded church by 13th-century Hungarian monks. The Pauline order of the Hungarian hermits was organized by Eusebius of Esztergom. In 1329 received confirmation from the Pope. In 1686, after the liberation of Buda from the Ottoman Empire, the Pauline moved to Pest when the former mosque was bought with a few neighboring houses. Their history and spirituality inspired the church's artwork. The monastery was built between 1715 and 1742. In place of the demolished mosque, the foundation stone of the present church was laid in 1725. Its architects were András Mayerhoffer, one of the most talented figures of Hungarian church and secular Baroque architecture, Mátyás Drenker and Márton Siegl. The church was consecrated in September 1742. The main portal and the benches were completed in 1744, the altarpiece in 1746, the carving, choir grid and stallum in 1748. The towers were completed in 1768. The church was completed in 1771. The church became the property of the Pázmány Péter Catholic University after the disintegration of the Pauline Order in 1786.

Since 1803, it was the joint church of the university and the Central Priestly Educational Institute, established in the monastery of Paul. Its profession is to mentor young university students and (mainly after 1900) the intellectual class of the capital.

Architecture 

The main facade of the church is divided into three parts. At the top of the triangular pediment is the Pauline coat of arms between the towers and the triangle on the left is Paul of Thebes and to the right is Anthony the Great.
A richly carved gate leads into the harmonious interior of a single-nave church with rows of chapels on both sides. The walls are covered with marble. The mature Baroque frescoes in the vaults are the works of the then world-famous Johann Bergl. The ornate high altar of Mary is the work of Antal Conti Lipót and his fresco depicts the Ascension of Mary. On the side of the sacristy, between the three columns, stands St. Anthony the Hermit. Opposite him stands Saint Paul the Hermit in the mantle of a characteristic palm made by József Hebenstreiter. The figural decorations of the master pulpit are probably from Antal Conti Lipót. The rich decorations of the oak benches and the table inserts depicting the various scenes deserve special attention.

Gallery

References

External links

Belváros-Lipótváros
Roman Catholic churches in Budapest
Baroque church buildings in Hungary
Roman Catholic churches completed in 1771
18th-century Roman Catholic church buildings in Hungary